Methylenomycin A is a cyclopentanone derived antibiotic produced by Streptomyces coelicolor A3(2) that is effective against both Gram-negative and Gram-positive bacteria. Methylenomycins are naturally produced in two variants: A and B.

See also
 Methylenomycin B

References

Antibiotics
Epoxides
Enones
Carboxylic acids
Oxygen heterocycles
Vinylidene compounds